Eucalyptus microschema is a species of small, shrubby mallee that is endemic to the southwest of Western Australia. It has smooth, silvery grey bark, linear adult leaves, flower buds in groups of nine or eleven, white flowers and short, barrel-shaped fruit. It is restricted to a small area near Newdegate.

Description
It has smooth, silvery grey bark on the trunk and branches. Flowering occurs between July and September and the flowers are white or creamy white.

Taxonomy
Eucalyptus microschema was first formally described in 1991 by Ian Brooker and Stephen Hopper in the journal Nuytsia from specimens collected southeast of Newdegate by Brooker. The specific epithet is from ancient Greek meaning "small form", referring to the stature of this mallee.

Distribution and habitat
This eucalypt mainly grows in low shrubland in scattered clumps to the east and southeast of Newdegate and towards Lake King.

Conservation status
Eucalyptus microschema is classified as "Priority Three" by the Government of Western Australia Department of Parks and Wildlife meaning that it is poorly known and known from only a few locations but is not under imminent threat.

See also
List of Eucalyptus species

References

Eucalypts of Western Australia
microschema
Myrtales of Australia
Plants described in 1991
Taxa named by Stephen Hopper
Taxa named by Ian Brooker